Semur-en-Auxois is a commune of the Côte-d'Or department in eastern France. The politician François Patriat, the engineers Edmé Régnier L'Aîné (1751–1825) and Émile Dorand (1866-1922), and the Encyclopédiste Philippe Guéneau de Montbeillard (1720–1785) were born in Semur-en-Auxois, while the military engineer Vauban (1633–1707) was educated at the Carmelite college.

Semur-en-Auxois has a medieval core, built on a pink granite bluff more than half-encircled by the River Armançon. The river formerly provided motive power for tanneries and mills, but its flow is now somewhat reduced by the Lac de Pont. The dam was built upstream in the 19th century to provide water for the Canal de Bourgogne.

Sport 
Semur-en-Auxois was the start of Stage 6 in the 2007 Tour de France.

Population

Sights

The church, La Collégiale Notre-Dame, was founded in 1225 and built in flamboyant Gothic style. It was restored in the 19th century by Viollet-le-Duc. The north tympanum depicts the legend of St. Thomas.
La porte Sauvigny, built in the 15th century, marks the entrance to the city
The fortified castle, built in the 13th century and dismantled in the 17th century. Parts visible today are:
La tour de l'Orle d'Or, with a height of 44 metres and walls 5 metres thick
La tour de la Gehenne
La tour de la Prison
La tour Margot, behind the theatre.
Bridges of the city crossing the Armançon:
Le pont Joly, which provides a picturesque view of the city
Le pont Pinard
Le pont des Minimes
The ramparts provide a promenade with views of the river

See also
 The Sinemurian Age of the Jurassic Period of geological time is named for Semur-en-Auxois
 Communes of the Côte-d'Or department

References

Communes of Côte-d'Or
Burgundy